The 2018 Queen's Club Championships (also known as the Fever-Tree Championships for sponsorship reasons) was a men's tennis tournament played on outdoor grass courts. It was the 116th edition of the event and part of the ATP World Tour 500 series of the 2018 ATP World Tour. It is taking place at the Queen's Club in London, United Kingdom from 18 June until 24 June 2018. The tournament marked the return of five-time champion Andy Murray who had been recovering from a hip injury. First-seeded Marin Čilić won the singles title.

Points and prize money

Point distribution

Prize money 

*per team

Singles main draw entrants

Seeds

 Rankings are as of June 11, 2018.

Other entrants
The following players received wildcards into the singles main draw:
  Jay Clarke
  Novak Djokovic
  Dan Evans
  Cameron Norrie

The following player received entry as a special exempt:
  Jérémy Chardy

The following players received entry from the qualifying draw:
  Julien Benneteau
  Yuki Bhambri
  John Millman
  Tim Smyczek

Withdrawals
Before the tournament
  Juan Martín del Potro →replaced by  Ryan Harrison
  Filip Krajinović →replaced by  Frances Tiafoe
  Rafael Nadal →replaced by  Daniil Medvedev
  Diego Schwartzman →replaced by  Jared Donaldson
  Jo-Wilfried Tsonga →replaced by  Leonardo Mayer

During the tournament
  Milos Raonic

Doubles main draw entrants

Seeds

 Rankings are as of June 11, 2018.

Other entrants
The following pairs received wildcards into the doubles main draw:
  Novak Djokovic /  Stan Wawrinka
  Lleyton Hewitt /  Nick Kyrgios

The following pair received entry from the qualifying draw:
  Daniel Nestor /  Denis Shapovalov

The following pair received entry as lucky losers:
  Marcus Daniell /  Wesley Koolhof

Withdrawals
Before the tournament
  Tomáš Berdych

Finals

Singles

  Marin Čilić defeated  Novak Djokovic, 5–7, 7–6(7–4), 6–3

Doubles

  Henri Kontinen /  John Peers defeated  Jamie Murray /  Bruno Soares 6–4, 6–3

Wheelchair singles

  Stefan Olsson defeated  Stéphane Houdet, 6–1, 6–4

Wheelchair doubles

  Stéphane Houdet /  Nicolas Peifer won a round robin competition against the teams of  Alfie Hewett /  Gordon Reid and  Daniel Caverzaschi /  Stefan Olsson

References

External links
 Official website
 ATP World Tour website

 
2018 ATP World Tour
2018 sports events in London
2018 in English tennis
June 2018 sports events in the United Kingdom
2018 Aegon Championships